Ravindra Kolhe and Smita Kolhe are Indian social activists and doctors working for tribal people in remote village areas of Bairagarh in Melghat region of Amravati district in Maharashtra. Ravindra Kolhe completed his MBBS in 1985 and MD in 1987 from Government Medical College, Nagpur. He has been actively working in Bairagarh area since 1985. He married Smita, also a doctor specializing in Ayurveda and Homeopathy, and together continued their work. Apart from medicinal help, the couple also makes general awareness campaigns for the tribals. The works of Kolhe couple has resulted in reduction of infant mortality rate from 200 per 1000 to 40 and pre-school mortality rate from 400 per 1000 to 100. In 2019, the couple received Padma Shri, India's fourth highest civilian award.

Further reading 
Various books published about Ravindra and Smita Kolhe are as below:
" Being the Change ",{ In The Footsteps of the Mahatma }  "English & Marathi", Author (Ashutosh Salil (IAS) & Barkha Mathur,)

References 

Indian health activists
Social workers
Indian women medical doctors
20th-century Indian medical doctors
Living people
Married couples
Recipients of the Padma Shri in medicine
Medical doctors from Maharashtra
Year of birth missing (living people)
20th-century Indian women